This is a list of lighthouses in Guinea-Bissau.

Lighthouses

See also
List of lighthouses in Senegal (to the north)
List of lighthouses in Guinea (to the south)
 Lists of lighthouses and lightvessels

References

External links

Guinea-Bissau
Lighthouses in Guinea-Bissau
Lighthouses
Lighthouses